Trondenes Fort is a fort situated on the Trondenes peninsula in the municipality of Harstad in Troms og Finnmark county, Norway. The fort has been the main base for the Norwegian Coastal Ranger Command since 2002. The fort was built in 1943 by the Nazis occupying Norway during World War II as a part of the Atlantic Wall.

Equipment
The fort was equipped with four of the world's largest land-based guns. The guns were taken out of the Norwegian mobilisation plans in 1961, but are still in place and one is kept in working order for conservation purposes. As a part of the Atlantic Wall, the fort is unique in its original set up and high degree of preservation.

References

External links
 Naval Gun Battery Trondenes

Royal Norwegian Navy bases
Forts in Norway
Harstad
Military installations in Troms og Finnmark
Military installations established in 1943
1943 establishments in Norway